Nebria lituyae is a species of ground beetle in the Nebriinae subfamily that is endemic to the US state of Alaska.

References

lituyae
Beetles described in 1979
Beetles of North America
Endemic fauna of the United States